The Australian Autogyro Skyhook, originally flown as the Minty Skyhook, was a small, single seat autogyro marketed in kit form. Three versions were offered, with differing engines and cabin enclosures.

Variants
 Mk I - open framework only, Rotax 503 engine
 Mk II - partially enclosed cabin, Volkswagen engine
 Mk III - fully enclosed cabin, Volkswagen engine

Specifications (Mk III)

References

 Tayor, John W. R., and Munson Kenneth. Jane's All The World's Aircraft 1981-1982 edition London: Jane' Publishing Company Limited,1981 
 
 
  Popular Rotorcraft Association website (page 17)

See also

1970s Australian sport aircraft
Autogyros
Aircraft first flown in 1978
Single-engined pusher aircraft